New York's 68th State Assembly district is one of the 150 districts in the New York State Assembly. It has been represented by Democrat Edward Gibbs following a special election in January 2022 to replace former Assembly member Robert J. Rodriguez upon his appointment as New York Secretary of State.

Geography
District 68 is located in northeastern Manhattan, comprising the neighborhood of East Harlem, as well as a small portion of Central Harlem and the Upper East Side. This district also contains Randalls and Wards Islands.

Recent election results

2022

2022 special

2020

2018

2016

2014

2012

2010

References

68